Nowabad-e Espian (also Romanized as Nowābād-e Espīān; also known as Eşpahān, Espīān, Ispāīn, and Lāpīān) is a village in Qara Bashlu Rural District, Chapeshlu District, Dargaz County, Razavi Khorasan Province, Iran. At the 2006 census, its population was 30, in 4 families.

References 

Populated places in Dargaz County